Bryan Pringle (19 January 1935 – 15 May 2002) was an English character actor who appeared for several decades in television, film and theatre productions.

Life and career
Born in Glascote, Tamworth, Staffordshire, he was brought up in the Lancashire town of Bolton. After boarding at St Bees School, Cumberland, he trained at the Royal Academy of Dramatic Art in London, winning the 1954 Bancroft Gold Medal and leaving in 1955. Three years later he married character actress Anne Jameson; together they had two children. She died in 1999.

Theatre work 
Pringle started as a member of the Old Vic company between 1955 and 1957, appearing with Coral Browne, John Neville, Claire Bloom and others in several Shakespeare plays and touring with four of them - Romeo and Juliet, Richard II, Troilus and Cressida and Macbeth - in the USA. He then moved to Nottingham Playhouse, where he appeared in the Willis Hall drama Boys It's All Hell and was the only cast member to travel with the play to London. There, Lindsay Anderson remounted it as The Long and the Short and the Tall at the Royal Court Theatre in January 1959; also starring Peter O'Toole and Robert Shaw, the play transferred to the New Theatre in April. Later that year, in October, Pringle appeared opposite Robert Shaw again in Guy Hamilton's production of the Beverley Cross play One More River at the Duke of York's Theatre.

In 1961 he was at Theatre Workshop, working with Joan Littlewood on the Henry Livings play Big Soft Nellie. (Ten years later he was top-billed in Michael Apted's TV version of the same play for Granada Television.) Then, having joined the Royal Shakespeare Company, he scored two personal successes in the summer of 1964, first as Stanley in Harold Pinter's The Birthday Party (directed by the playwright), then as the dustbin-bound Nagg in the Samuel Beckett play Endgame. Among later theatre credits, he starred with Jane Asher and Brian Murphy in the Romain Weingarten play Summer at the Fortune Theatre in 1968, appeared as Malvolio in Twelfth Night at the Bankside Globe in 1973 (reprising the role at the Ludlow Festival 15 years later), was Michael Crawford's father in Billy at the Theatre Royal Drury Lane in 1974, returned to Nottingham Playhouse in 1977 to play Dogberry in Much Ado About Nothing and appeared opposite David Suchet in the John Hopkins play This Story of Yours (Hampstead Theatre, 1987). In his final decade he appeared in major revivals of My Fair Lady (as Doolittle; 1992) and Joe Orton's Entertaining Mr Sloane (as Kemp; 1999–2001).

Film work 
Pringle appeared in many films, beginning with Saturday Night and Sunday Morning (1960) as Rachel Roberts' cuckolded husband. He also appeared alongside Norman Wisdom in the 1965 film The Early Bird as the treacherous rival milkman, Austin, the role for which he is perhaps best remembered. He continued to be cast in many notable films, such as French Dressing and The Boyfriend (both for director Ken Russell), Brazil, Drowning by Numbers and B. Monkey.

Television work 
Pringle also made numerous television appearances, gaining fame as 'Cheese & Egg' in the Granada Television sitcom The Dustbinmen (1969–70). Earlier, he was Charles Pooter in Diary of a Nobody, made by Ken Russell for BBC 2 in 1964; also for the BBC, he played Len Wiles, adoptive father of Terry Wiles, in On Giant's Shoulders in 1979, Pistol in Shakespeare's Henry IV Part II and Henry V the same year, and Sergeant Match in a 1987 version of the Joe Orton play What the Butler Saw.

In 1980 he played Albert Case, leader of a group of villains in The Professionals episode Weekend in the Country. Other notable appearances were as landlord Arthur Pringle in Series 2 of Auf Wiedersehen, Pet (1986), as Barker in the Inspector Morse episode Deceived by Flight (1989) and as pathologist Felix Norman in Prime Suspect (1991). He played the part of the farmer Mr. Grimsdale in the second series of "All Creatures Great and Small". Pringle also appeared in 1985 in a well-known TV commercial advertising Heineken beer, playing a cockney elocutionist attempting to teach an upper-class woman (Sylvestra Le Touzel) how to say "The wa'er in Major'a don' taste like wot id ough' 'a" ("The water in Majorca don't taste like what it ought to").

In the early 1980s he also appeared in a series of International Direct Dialling adverts. In the first advert he had the classic line "Sydney who?" only to be told "Not Sydney who, Sydney Australia", at which point the shock causes him to forcefully spit out a mouthful of tea he has just taken. The theme continued in further adverts.

Death
In later life Pringle lived in Northamptonshire, where he died on 15 May 2002; his body was buried alongside his wife's in the cemetery of St Laurence Church in Brafield on the Green.

Selected filmography

 The Challenge (1960) - sergeant
 Saturday Night and Sunday Morning (1960) - Jack
 H.M.S. Defiant (1962) - Sgt Kneebone
 Lawrence of Arabia (1962) - driver (uncredited)
 French Dressing (1964) - the Mayor
 The Early Bird (1965) - Austin
 How I Won the War (1967) - reporter
 Berserk! (1967) - Constable Bradford
 Diamonds for Breakfast (1968) - police sergeant
 Spring and Port Wine (1970) - bowler 3
 The Boy Friend (1971) - Percy Parkhill / Percy Browne
 Mister Quilp (1975) - Mr Garland
 Jabberwocky (1977) - guard at gate
 Bullshot (1983) - waiter
 The Young Visiters (1984) - Minnit the butler
 Brazil (1985) - Spiro
 Haunted Honeymoon (1986) - Pfister
 Consuming Passions (1988) - gateman
 Drowning by Numbers (1988) - Jake
 Inspector Morse (1989) - Barker (The Porter)
 Getting It Right (1989) - Mr Lamb
 Crimestrike (1990) - Super
 Three Men and a Little Lady (1990) - old Englishman
 American Friends (1991) - Haskell
 The Steal (1995) - Cecil, bank doorman
 Restoration (1995) - watchman
 Snow White: A Tale of Terror (1997) - Father Gilbert
 The Legend of 1900 (1998) - civil servant
 B. Monkey (1998) - Goodchild
 Darkness Falls (1999) - Mr Hayter
 Lover's Prayer (2001) - Stepan

Television

References

External links
 
 Obituary in The Independent
 Obituary in The Telegraph
 Obituary in The Guardian

1935 births
2002 deaths
Alumni of RADA
English male film actors
English male stage actors
English male television actors
People from Bolton
People from Tamworth, Staffordshire